Scandinavian Unexceptionalism: Culture, Markets and the Failure of Third-Way Socialism (2015) is a book by Kurdish-Swedish author and scientist Nima Sanandaji, promoting the idea that unique norms and free markets can explain the economic and social success of Scandinavia rather than large welfare states. The book was published on June 23, 2015 by the British think tank Institute of Economic Affairs, and was also released in Stockholm in co-operation with think tank Timbro. The foreword is written by American libertarian author Tom G. Palmer.

Synopsis 
In the book, Sanandaji argues that particularly the left has long praised Scandinavian countries for their high levels of welfare provision and admirable societal outcomes. Although true that Scandinavian countries are successful, the author makes the case that this success pre-dates the welfare state. According to Sanandaji Scandinavians became successful by combining a culture with strong emphasis on individual responsibility with economic freedom. This can also explain why Scandinavian Americans, who live outside Nordic welfare states, have low levels of poverty and high levels of prosperity.

Reception 

In the International Business Times, Ian Allison writes that Scandinavian Unexceptionalism shows that "many desirable aspects of Scandinavian societies, such as low income inequality, low levels of poverty and high economic growth pre-dated the development of a generous welfare state".

American economist Tyler Cowen wrote that the book "has many points of interest", quoting a paragraph about the success of Scandinavian migrants to the United States.

Allister Heath, deputy editor of The Daily Telegraph, wrote that the book shows how the "remarkable work ethic" of Scandinavians has been eroded by large welfare states over time.

Swedish economist Gabriel Sahlgren wrote that the book neglects to show that the "smaller welfare state development prior to the great expansion from the 1960s onward" was important for the development in Scandinavia.

The book has received international attention, mainly through various free-market think tanks. On 29 June 2015, it appeared as the front-page article of French-language newspaper L'AGEFI, published in Switzerland.

In The New York Post, Rich Lowry wrote: "There are a couple of things wrong with the Left’s romance with these countries, as Swedish analyst Nima Sanandaji notes in a recent monograph. It doesn't fully appreciate the sources of Nordic success, or how Scandinavia has turned away from the socialism so alluring to its international admirers".

In The Boston Globe, Jeff Jacoby commented: "In Scandinavian Unexceptionalism, a penetrating new book published by the Institute of Economic Affairs, Sanandaji shows that the Nordic nations' prosperity 'developed during periods characterized by free-market policies, low or moderate taxes, and limited state involvement in the economy'".

Table of contents 
 Preface
 Understanding Nordic success
 The Scandinavian free-market success story 
 The failure of third-way policies - entrepreneurship
 Job creation during free-market and third-way periods
 Hiding the rise of taxation 
 Admirable social outcomes and low levels of inequality before big welfare states
 Success of Scandinavian descendants in the US 
 Welfare dependency 
 The welfare state – social poverty and ethical values
 Norway vs Sweden – a natural experiment in welfare state reform
 The welfare state and the failure of immigration policy
 Welfare states and the success of women 
 Rock stars of free-market recovery 
 Scandinavian unexceptionalism 
 Glossary, Select Bibliography, Acknowledgements, Index

References

Footnotes

External links 
 
 Release of Scandinavian Unexceptionalism in Sweden

Political science books
Economics books
2015 non-fiction books